The Guild Chapel of the Holy Cross, Stratford-upon-Avon, Warwickshire is a chapel of 13th century origins. Founded by the Guild of the Holy Cross before 1269, it passed into the control of the town corporation in 1553, when the Guild was suppressed by Edward VI. The chapel stands on Church Street, opposite the site of William Shakespeare's home, New Place, and has historic connections to Shakespeare's family. The chapel was gifted an extensive series of wall-paintings by Hugh Clopton, an earlier owner of New Place, and John Shakespeare, Shakespeare's father, undertook their defacement in the later 1500s. The paintings have recently been conserved.

Clopton undertook a major expansion of the chapel before his death in 1496, constructing a new nave which was incomplete when he died. The chapel was restored in a thirty-year programme undertaken by Stephen Dykes Bower from 1954-1983 and is a Grade I listed building. Owned and maintained by the Stratford-upon-Avon Town Trust, the chapel is used for services by King Edward VI School.

History
The Guild of the Holy Cross was a medieval religious membership foundation and the guild in Stratford-upon-Avon became a powerful societal force. Members paid fees to join and a range of services were provided, including a hospital and a school, the provision of a priest to pray for the dead, as well as support for the poor. Within the town, the guild constructed its guildhall on Church Street and the adjacent chapel was built circa 1260.

Clopton's wall-paintings depicted a cycle of images showing, among others, the Doom, the Allegory of Death, the Life of Adam and St George Slaying the Dragon. They were covered over by John Shakespeare some time in the 1560s-1570s, acting as town chamberlain and in accordance with Elizabeth I's injunction of 1559 to remove "all signs of superstition and idolatry from places of worship". John Shakespeare's contemporary record details his paying two shillings for "defasyng ymages in ye chapel". The wall-paintings were rediscovered under limewash in 1804 and were recorded by the antiquarian and draughtsman Thomas Fisher. A restoration project undertaken in 2016 won the Society for the Protection of Ancient Buildings John Betjeman award in 2017.

A major programme of archaeological investigation, carried out by the Department of Archaeology at the University of York in the early 21st century and making innovative use of digital modelling, described the chapel as "one of Europe's most important surviving late-medieval Guild Chapels".
 
The 'Great Bell', a curfew bell cast in 1633, was renovated in 2018.

Architecture and description
The chancel is 13th century, with the nave and tower dating from Hugh Clopton's rebuilding on c.1490.

Notes

Sources

External links

Grade I listed buildings in Warwickshire
Buildings and structures in Stratford-upon-Avon